The year 1699 in architecture involved some significant architectural events and new buildings.

Buildings and structures

Buildings

English architect and dramatist John Vanbrugh is commissioned to begin Castle Howard in Yorkshire.
Craigiehall, Scotland, designed by Sir William Bruce and James Smith, is completed for William Johnstone, 1st Marquess of Annandale
St Werburgh's Church, Derby, England
Thomas Lambert House, Rowley, Massachusetts completed
Trinity Cathedral in Pskov, Russia completed

Births
February 10 – Francisco Hurtado Izquierdo, Spanish Baroque architect (died 1725)
February 17 – Georg Wenzeslaus von Knobelsdorff, Prussian painter and architect (died 1753)
date unknown
Matthew Brettingham, English Palladian country and town house architect (died 1769)
Edward Lovett Pearce, Irish Palladian architect (died 1733)

Deaths
November – Stephen Manwaring, North Carolina architect (born c.1640)

References